NSSR may refer to:
 The New School for Social Research
 North Shore Scenic Railroad, a heritage railway between Duluth and Two Harbors, Minnesota, USA
 Norwegian Society for Sea Rescue
 North Shore Safety Riders, a Sydney downhill skating crew.
 North Shore Stump Removal Ltd, Tree Stump Removal Business, Auckland, NZ

no:NSSR